The Land Consolidation Engineering Bureau (LCEB) is the agency of the Ministry of the Interior of Taiwan (Republic of China) responsible for land rezoning.

History
The bureau was originally established as a temporary government institution called the Taiwan Province, Land Administration Bureau, Farmland Rezoning and Planning Headquarter. On 1 January 1975, it was renamed to Taiwan Province Land Administration Bureau, Land Consolidation Engineering Headquarter by the instruction of Taiwan Provincial Government and became a permanent institution administering land consolidation affairs in Taiwan under the provincial government as level 4 provincial institute. On 1 July 1979. it was renamed to Taiwan Provincial Government Land Administration Department and promoted to level 2 provincial institute. On 1 July 1999, it was renamed to Land Consolidation Engineering Bureau.

Organizational structure
Urban Land Consolidation Engineering Section
Farmland Consolidation Engineering Section
Rural Renewal Construction Section
Survey Engineering Section
Secretary Office
Accounting Office
Personnel Office
Ethics Office

See also
 Ministry of the Interior (Taiwan)

References

External links
 

1999 establishments in Taiwan
Executive Yuan
Government agencies established in 1999
Organizations based in Taichung